Ebony Vernice Hoffman (born August 27, 1982) is a former professional basketball player and a current assistant coach for the Seattle Storm. She played and won the championship with Fenerbahçe İstanbul in Turkey. She currently plays for Beşiktaş İstanbul in Turkey. She also played for Polisportiva Ares Ribera in Italy and TEO Vilnius in Lithuania, Ramat Hasharon in Israel.

Personal life
According to a DNA analysis, she descended, mainly, of people from  Sierra Leone.

High school
Hoffman played for Narbonne High School in Harbor City, California, where she was named a WBCA All-American. She participated in the 2000 WBCA High School All-America Game where she scored nine points.

College and professional
She was selected by the Indiana Fever as the ninth overall pick in the 2004 WNBA Draft. She attended the University of Southern California (USC).

In 2008, Hoffman was selected as the WNBA's Most Improved Player.

USC statistics
Source

USA Basketball
Hoffman was a member of the USA Women's U18 team which won the gold medal at the FIBA Americas Championship in Mar Del Plata, Argentina. The event was held in July 2000, when the USA team defeated Cuba to win the championship. Hoffman helped the team win all five games, scoring 6.8 points per game.

Hoffman was invited to the USA Basketball Women's National Team training camp in the fall of 2009. The team selected to play for the 2010 FIBA World Championship and the 2012 Olympics is usually chosen from these participants. At the conclusion of the training camp, the team will travel to Ekaterinburg, Russia, where they compete in the 2009 UMMC Ekaterinburg International Invitational.

In popular culture
Hoffman appears as herself on season 3, episode 3 of the IFC television series Comedy Bang Bang!.

Notes 

Offseason 2008–09: Overseas Roster

External links
WNBA player profile
2004 chat transcript
USC player profile

1982 births
Living people
American expatriate basketball people in China
American expatriate basketball people in Israel
American expatriate basketball people in Italy
American expatriate basketball people in Lithuania
American expatriate basketball people in Turkey
American people of Sierra Leonean descent
American women's basketball players
Basketball players from Los Angeles
Centers (basketball)
Connecticut Sun players
Fenerbahçe women's basketball players
Indiana Fever draft picks
Indiana Fever players
Los Angeles Sparks players
Seattle Storm coaches
Shanxi Flame players
USC Trojans women's basketball players